At the 11th annual Four Hills Tournament, the strong Norwegian team saw three of its tournament debutants within the Top 5. Toralf Engan dominated the tour with three clear victories and became the second Norwegian to win the tour after Olaf Bjørnstad 10 years earlier.

Participating nations and athletes

With the exception of Wolfgang Schüller, the athletes from the German Democratic Republic did not compete at the two events in Germany for political reasons.

Results

Oberstdorf
 Schattenbergschanze, Oberstdorf
28 December 1962

Innsbruck
 Bergiselschanze, Innsbruck
30 December 1962

Garmisch-Partenkirchen
 Große Olympiaschanze, Garmisch-Partenkirchen
01 January 1963

Bischofshofen
 Paul-Ausserleitner-Schanze, Bischofshofen
06 January 1963

After three clear victories, there was little chance for Engan's opponents to catch up to him in the overall ranking.

Within ten years, Engan was the fourth athlete to compete in Bischofshofen after having won all three previous events. Like all of his predecessors in that regard, he did not manage to secure a fourth victory.

John Balfanz became the first non-European to finish on a podium at a Four Hills event.

Final ranking

References

External links
 FIS website
 Four Hills Tournament web site

Four Hills Tournament
1962 in ski jumping
1963 in ski jumping